Periyasamy Chandrasekaran (17 April 1957 – 1 January 2010) was a Sri Lankan trade unionist, politician and government minister.

Early life and family
Chandrasekaran was born on 17 April 1957 in Talawakelle in central Ceylon. He was educated at Sumana Demala Maha Vidyalayam, Talawakelle, St. Patrick's Vidyalayam, Talawakelle and Highlands College, Hatton. Following the death of his father he gave up his education to support his family.

Chandrasekaran was married Shanthini Devi. They had two daughters.

Career
Chandrasekaran became interested in politics at a young age and wrote articles in Tamil newspapers. He joined the Ceylon Workers' Congress (CWC), becoming its vice-president in 1977. He was elected to the Talawakele Lindula Urban Council in 1982, Nuwara Eliya District Development Council in 1985 and Nuwara Eliya Divisional Council in 1987. He left the CWC in 1989 and formed the Up-Country People's Front (UCPF).

Chandrasekaran was one of the Democratic People's Liberation Front's (DPLF) candidates in Nuwara Eliya District at the 1989 parliamentary election but the DPLF failed to win any seats in Parliament. He was arrested in 1990. The draconian Prevention of Terrorism Act was used to arrest him 1993. He was elected to the Central Provincial Council whilst in custody.

Chandrasekaran was one of the UCPF's candidates for Nuwara Eliya District at the 1994 parliamentary election. He was elected and entered Parliament. He was re-elected at the 2000, 2001 and 2004 parliamentary elections.

After being elected to Parliament in 1994 he supported the new People's Alliance government. He held several ministerial appointments thereafter: Deputy Minister of Trade and Commerce (1994); Deputy Minister of Estate Housing (1994–99); Project Minister of Estate Infrastructure (2001); Minister of Community Development; Deputy Minister of Irrigation and Water Management (2001–04); and Minister of Community Development and Social Inequity Eradication (2007–10).

Chandrasekaran was a diabetic but drank whiskey which resulted in him suffering alcohol-related illnesses. He was receiving treatment from Northwick Park Hospital and St Mark's Hospital in the UK. Doctors had recommended that he stops drinking and after 4–6 months undergo liver transplant. According to his wife Chandrasekaran didn't follow the medical advice.

Chandrasekaran, who was at his home in Rajagiriya, failed to wake up on the morning of 1 January 2010. He was taken to the private Nawaloka Hospital where he was pronounced dead on admission. An autopsy revealed he had died of alcoholic cirrhosis.

Electoral history

References

1957 births
2010 deaths
Cabinet ministers of Sri Lanka
Ceylon Workers' Congress politicians
Deputy ministers of Sri Lanka
Indian Tamil politicians of Sri Lanka
Indian Tamil trade unionists of Sri Lanka
Local authority councillors of Sri Lanka
Members of the 10th Parliament of Sri Lanka
Members of the 11th Parliament of Sri Lanka
Members of the 12th Parliament of Sri Lanka
Members of the 13th Parliament of Sri Lanka
Members of the Central Provincial Council
People from Central Province, Sri Lanka
Sri Lankan Hindus
United People's Freedom Alliance politicians
Up-Country People's Front politicians